Pete Whittaker (born 1991) is a British professional rock climber. He is one half of the duo known as the Wide Boyz, along with his climbing partner Tom Randall. Whittaker came to notability from crack climbing, including the first ascent of the world's hardest off-width climb, the Century Crack.

Climbing career
In 2011, Whittaker and Randall made a visit to the United States, where he was the first to flashed Belly Full of Bad Berries (5.13b), a highly regarded off-width in Indian Creek. Continuing the trip, Whittaker and Randall made the first ascent of the Century Crack (5.14b), the world's hardest off-width climb. After initially sending the route with pre-placed gear, both subsequently repeated the climb while placing their own gear.

In 2014, Whittaker became the first to flash Freerider (5.12d) on El Capitan.

In 2016, Whittaker made the first rope solo free-climb of Freerider.

In 2021, Whittaker and Randall free-climbed the Great Rift (5.13), a 2,500-foot roof crack on the underside of a highway overpass in Devon, England. Their ascent was documented in the short film Bridge Boys, which was featured in Reel Rock 16.

Ascents

Redpoint
:
Recovery drink – Jøssingfjord (NOR) – August 2019 – Third ascent
Kaa'bah – Raven Tor (UK) – June 2015 – Sixth ascent
:
Cobra Crack – Squamish (Canada) – 2013 – Eighth ascent
Century Crack – Canyonlands (US) – 2011 – First ascent

Flash
8b/8b+ (5.13d/5.14a):

 La Fuerza de la Gravedad – Vadiello (ESP) – December 2022

:

Ronny Medelsvensson – Jøssingfjord (NOR) – August 2019

:

Belly Full of Bad Berries – Indian Creek (US) – 2011

Filmography
 Wide Boyz – 2012 – Directed by Chris Alstrin and Paul Diffley
 Bridge Boys – 2022

Bibliography
 Whittaker, Pete. Crack Climbing: The Definitive Guide. Mountaineers Books, 2019. 304 p.

References

1991 births
Living people
British rock climbers